José Farías (20 October 1909 – 8 June 1964) was a Peruvian long-distance runner. He competed in the marathon at the 1936 Summer Olympics.

References

1909 births
1964 deaths
Athletes (track and field) at the 1936 Summer Olympics
Peruvian male long-distance runners
Peruvian male marathon runners
Olympic athletes of Peru
Place of birth missing
20th-century Peruvian people